Dominick Napolitano (June 16, 1930 – August 17, 1981), also known as Sonny Black, was an American Mafia caporegime in the Bonanno crime family. He is known for unwittingly allowing FBI agent Joseph D. Pistone to become an associate in his crew and nearly getting him made.

Early life 
Napolitano's grandparents were immigrants from Naples, Italy. Napolitano was born with blond hair, but by his forties it had turned a gunmetal white-silver color. To hide the color, he dyed it black, earning him the nickname "Sonny Black". He was a close friend of future Bonanno crime family boss Joseph Massino; incarcerated boss Philip Rastelli knew Napolitano before he went to prison. He was close to Carmine Napolitano (May 30, 1943 – February 15, 1999), a cousin and fellow Bonanno mobster. Like his sons Peter Napolitano (November 17, 1957 – June 29, 1994), Aniello Napolitano and Rocco Napolitano who were born and raised in Williamsburg, Brooklyn; he was also raised there.

Napolitano controlled Williamsburg, Brooklyn, and from 1979–80, he operated in Pasco County, Florida, and from Holiday, Florida, after negotiating control of the territory with Santo Trafficante, Jr. At that time, Napolitano set his sights on operating a major bookmaking operation in Orlando.

Caporegime 

Napolitano rose to prominence in 1973 as a soldier for Michael Sabella and was promoted to capo, replacing his mentor after the gangland execution of the powerful rival capo Carmine "The Cigar" Galante. Sabella was demoted and Napolitano took over the crew. He became a trusted confidant of the imprisoned mobster Phillip "Rusty" Rastelli who took over leadership permanently again. But when Rastelli took over, it caused the Bonannos to split into two factions, one loyal to Rastelli, the other attempting to overthrow him in favor of the Sicilian faction, led by Alphonse "Sonny Red" Indelicato. 

Napolitano owned the Wither's Italian-American Veterans of Foreign Wars Club at 415 Graham Avenue in Williamsburg, Brooklyn, and also The Motion Lounge at 420 Graham Avenue. He later ran an illegal casino in Pasco County, Florida, and owned a tennis club and night club called The King's Court Bottle Club in Holiday, Florida.

Napolitano's headquarters were in the heart of Williamsburg's Italian neighborhood. His crew, involved in burglary, extortion, robbery, bank robbery, loansharking, hijacking, bookmaking, casino operations and drug trafficking, were one of the most successful crews in the Bonanno family. Napolitano's crew included Bonanno street soldiers Benjamin "Lefty" Ruggiero, Nicholas Santora, Louis Attanasio, John Cersani, Jerome Asaro, Anthony Francomano, Sandro Asaro, John Faraci, Daniel Mangelli, Robert Lino, Frank Lino, Richard Riccardi, Joseph Grimaldi, Nicholas Accardi, Peter Rosa, Patrick DeFilippo, Michael Mancuso, Vito Grimaldi, Anthony Urso, James Tartaglione, Joseph Cammarano, John Zancocchio, Edward Barberra, Frankie Fish, Bobby Badheart, Bobby Smash and his previous capo Michael Sabella, Joseph Puma, Steven Maruca, Salvatore Farrugia, Anthony Pesiri, Antonio Tomasulo, Anthony Rabito, Raymond Wean, Frank DiStefano, Salvatore D'Ottavio, James Episcopa and Donnie Brasco.

Operation Donnie Brasco 
Napolitano assigned associate Donnie Brasco in September 1981, whom he hoped to make a made man, to kill Bruno Indelicato, who had previously evaded death when he missed the meeting when the three capos were killed in May 1981. "Brasco", however, was in fact an undercover FBI agent named Joseph Pistone; shortly after the hit was ordered, Pistone's assignment was ended, and Napolitano was informed of their infiltration. In 1981, Napolitano and Joseph Massino, who were loyal to Rastelli, were chiefly responsible for helping to end the struggle by killing three capos opposed to Rastelli: Alphonse Indelicato, Dominick Trinchera and Philip Giaccone. Already skeptical of Napolitano's support of "Brasco", Massino was deeply disturbed by the breach of security when he learned of the agent's true identity. Salvatore Vitale would later testify that this was the reason Massino subsequently decided to murder Napolitano as well; as he would later quote Massino, "I have to give him a receipt for the Donnie Brasco situation."

Death 
On August 17, 1981, Napolitano was summoned to a meeting in the basement of Bonanno associate Ron Filocomo's home in Flatlands, Brooklyn. Anticipating that he would be killed, Napolitano gave his jewelry to his favorite bartender, who worked below his apartment at the Motion Lounge, along with the keys to his apartment so that his pet pigeons could be cared for. Bonanno capo Frank Lino and Steven Canone drove Napolitano to the house of Filocomo and Frank Coppa, who was also present. Napolitano was pushed down the staircase to Filocomo's basement and shot to death by Filocomo and Lino with .38 caliber revolvers. When the first shot misfired, Napolitano told them, "Hit me one more time and make it good".

Napolitano's girlfriend Judy later contacted Pistone and told him that, shortly before his death, Napolitano had told her that he bore no ill will towards Pistone, knowing that Pistone was only doing his job, and that if anyone was responsible for taking him down, he was glad it was Pistone. She said that Napolitano really loved Pistone and was upset when he found out he was an agent. Napolitano could not believe that Pistone was an agent because of the "things we had done together, the conversations we'd had, the feelings we'd had."

In August, FBI surveillance noticed workmen dismantling Napolitano's pigeon coops atop the Motion Lounge. On August 12, 1982, a body was found at South Avenue and Bridge Street in Arlington, Staten Island; the corpse's hands were severed and the face was so badly decomposed that dental records were required to verify the identity. The FBI announced that it had found the corpse of Napolitano. In 2000, however, they publicly revealed doubts about whether the corpse was correctly identified.

In 2003, Bonanno boss Joseph Massino was arrested and charged with a variety of crimes, with the case centering on the murder of Napolitano. At Massino's trial, prosecutors claimed that Napolitano was killed by his associates for allowing his crew to be compromised, and that his hands had been removed as a warning to other mobsters to follow the rule about proper introductions (the implication being the association between shaking hands and being introduced to someone). Massino was convicted in 2004 and sentenced to life imprisonment.

In 2006, Frank Lino and Frank Coppa turned state's evidence, providing authorities with the details of Napolitano's murder. Although the FBI were reasonably sure that the body found in Staten Island was Napolitano’s, one discrepancy existed: Lino claimed that he and Filocomo shot Napolitano with .38 caliber revolvers and that he himself had fired more than once. But the corpse had only one bullet wound, apparently made by a .45 caliber pistol. Coppa later said that Napolitano "died like a man". Napolitano was buried in Calvary Cemetery, Queens. About Napolitano's fate, Pistone had stated, "My intention in all of this was to put people in jail, not get them killed", and that he was sorry for Napolitano's murder.

In popular culture 
 In the 1997 film Donnie Brasco, Dominick Napolitano was portrayed by Michael Madsen.

See also
List of solved missing person cases

References

Further reading 
 Crittle, Simon, The Last Godfather: The Rise and Fall of Joey Massino Berkley (March 7, 2006) 
 DeStefano, Anthony. The Last Godfather: Joey Massino & the Fall of the Bonanno Crime Family. California: Citadel, 2006.
 Morton, James, East End Gangland & Gangland International Omnibus Chapter: "Florida"
 Pistone, Joseph, Donnie Brasco: My Undercover Life in the Mafia. Random House Value Publishing (February 1990) 
 Pistone, Joseph D.; & Brandt, Charles (2007). Donnie Brasco: Unfinished Business, Running Press. .
 Raab, Selwyn. Five Families: The Rise, Decline, and Resurgence of America's Most Powerful Mafia Empires. New York: St. Martin Press, 2005.

External links 
 An Archetypal Mob Trial: It's Just Like in the Movies, The New York Times, May 23, 2004.
 Dominick (Sonny Black) Napolitano at Find a Grave

1930 births
1980s missing person cases
1981 deaths
Bonanno crime family
Burials at Calvary Cemetery (Queens)
Criminals from New York City
Deaths by firearm in Brooklyn
Missing person cases in New York City
Murdered American gangsters of Italian descent
People from Holiday, Florida
People from Williamsburg, Brooklyn
People murdered by the Bonanno crime family
People murdered in New York City
Male murder victims